Rose "Osang" Fostanes (born January 2, 1967) is a Filipina singer living in Israel, who on January 14, 2014, won the first season of The X Factor Israel On April 10, 2014, she signed a record contract with Star Records to release her music material in the Philippines. Her debut album My Way was released on June 8, 2014.

Biography
Rose Fostanes was born in Taguig, Philippines. At the age of 23, she left the country to work as a foreign caregiver. Fostanes arrived in Israel in 2008 to work for an ailing woman in her 50s. She is openly lesbian.

Singing career
Fostanes was the lead vocalist of a band that performs in a small bar in Neve Sha'anan, Tel Aviv.

Fostanes auditioned for X Factor on October 26, 2013, singing the Shirley Bassey song, "This Is My Life". She received a "yes" vote from all four judges. Fostanes attracted international attention immediately after appearing as a contestant on the show.

Fostanes performed again during bootcamp, receiving a standing ovation from all the contestants. She made it to the top 20 and was assigned Shiri Maimon as a mentor.
 
On November 23, 2013, Fostanes performed at a charity event, "Concert for a Cause For Typhoon Yolanda" in Haifa, Israel, organized by the OFW in Israel Organization. The event raised money for Typhoon Yolanda victims in the Philippines.

Due to the conditions of her visa, Fostanes was not able to perform for pay in Israel. This was changed on January 20, 2014, when she was granted singing license in Israel.

Performances

My Way and Philippine debut
Through her contract with Aroma Music, she performed during Israeli Independence Day shows in Acre and Tiberias. The company released her debut single "Walk Away". It was produced and composed by Ofer Meiri. She also had three shows in Australia. She was awarded "Global Entertainer of the Year" at the Gawad Amerika Awards in Los Angeles. She also appeared in a role in the film It's Just the Wind directed by director Amity Zmora.

On April 10, 2014, she signed a record contract with Star Records to release her music material in the Philippines. Her Philippine debut album, My Way, was released on June 8.

In December 2015, Elijah Sparks released the single "Baby Love" that featured vocals by Rose Fostanes.

Discography

Albums
2014: My Way

Singles
2014: "Walk Away"

See also 
 The X Factor Israel
 Music in Israel

References

External links
Facebook

1967 births
21st-century Filipino women singers
Filipino migrant workers
Lesbian singers
Filipino lesbian musicians
Israeli lesbian musicians
Star Magic
Living people
Filipino LGBT singers
Israeli LGBT singers
People from Taguig
People from Tel Aviv
The X Factor winners
Star Music artists
Filipino emigrants
20th-century Filipino LGBT people
21st-century Filipino LGBT people
20th-century Israeli LGBT people
21st-century Israeli LGBT people
21st-century Israeli women singers